Killeen High School is a 5A public high school located in Killeen, Texas, USA. It is one of seven high schools in the Killeen Independent School District, which is located in western Bell County.  In 2011, the school was rated "Academically Acceptable" by the Texas Education Agency.

Athletics
The Killeen Kangaroos compete in the following sports:

 Baseball
 Basketball
 Bowling
 Cheerleading
 Cross Country
 Football
 Golf
 Soccer
 Softball
 Swimming and Diving
 Tennis
 Track and Field
 Volleyball
 Wrestling

State titles
 Football -  1991 (5A/D1)
 Boys Track -  1978 (4A), 1979 (4A), 1980 (4A), 1981 (5A), 1991 (5A)

State finalists
 Football – 1954 (2A)
 Volleyball – 1976 (4A)
 Girls Water Polo – 1981, 1982, 1983
 Cheerleading — 2018 (6A)
 Boys Swimming – 1979

Notable alumni
 Mark Adickes, former NFL player
 Brandon Bernard, murderer
 Don Hardeman, former NFL player
 Juaquin Iglesias, former NFL player
 Anthony McDowell, former NFL player
 David McMillan, former NFL player
 Gerald McNeil, former NFL player
 Pat McNeil, former NFL player
 Chris Morgan, current NFL coach
 Darrol Ray, former NFL player
 TaShawn Thomas (born 1993), basketball player in the Israeli Premier League
 Craig Watts, former NFL player and coach

See also

 List of high schools in Texas

References

External links

 Killeen Independent School District website

High schools in Bell County, Texas
Killeen Independent School District high schools